Milan Živadinović (15 December 1944 – 17 July 2021) was a Serbian football player and coach. He was also the scout for Ghanaian footballers for Southeast Europe. In his homeland he was nicknamed Bard.

Career
Early in his coaching career, Živadinović was a student of Hugo Ruševljanin under whose guidance he plied his trade. Throughout his career, he advocated that a 2–0 lead is the worst lead.

His last appointment was as the head coach of Myanmar in 2011.

Death
Živadinović died on 17 July 2021 at the age of 76.

Honours
Red Star Belgrade
 FR Yugoslavia Cup: 1992–93

References

1944 births
2021 deaths
Footballers from Belgrade
Association football defenders
Association football forwards
Yugoslav footballers
Serbian footballers
Red Star Belgrade footballers
NK Čelik Zenica players
FK Vardar players
FK Sloboda Užice players
HNK Rijeka players
FK Crvenka players
Yugoslav First League players
Yugoslav football managers
Serbian football managers
Serbia and Montenegro football managers
FK Spartak Subotica managers
FK Rad managers
FK Sutjeska Nikšić managers
Sakaryaspor managers
FK Budućnost Podgorica managers
FK Radnički Niš managers
FC Prishtina managers
Al-Shabab SC (Kuwait) managers
OFK Beograd managers
Red Star Belgrade non-playing staff
Red Star Belgrade managers
Serbia and Montenegro national football team managers
Al Nassr FC managers
Iraq national football team managers
FK Obilić managers
Yemen national football team managers
Ghana national football team managers
Saba Qom F.C. managers
Guangzhou City F.C. managers
Myanmar national football team managers
Yugoslav expatriate football managers
Expatriate football managers in Turkey
Yugoslav expatriate sportspeople in Turkey
Expatriate football managers in Kuwait
Yugoslav expatriate sportspeople in Kuwait
Serbia and Montenegro expatriate football managers
Expatriate football managers in Saudi Arabia
Serbia and Montenegro expatriate sportspeople in Saudi Arabia
Expatriate football managers in Iraq
Serbia and Montenegro expatriate sportspeople in Iraq
Expatriate football managers in Yemen
Expatriate football managers in Ghana
Serbia and Montenegro expatriate sportspeople in Ghana
Expatriate football managers in Iran
Serbia and Montenegro expatriate sportspeople in Iran
Serbian expatriate football managers
Expatriate football managers in China
Serbian expatriate sportspeople in China
Expatriate football managers in Myanmar
Kuwait Premier League managers
Serbian expatriate sportspeople in Ghana